Carlos Molina (born November 18, 1985) is an American professional boxer. He is also the brother of two Olympic Boxers (Twins) Javier for the U.S. and Oscar who fights for Mexico.

Amateur career
Molina's amateur career ended with a record of 105-20.

Professional career
On the same Showtime boxing card of Márquez-Vázquez IV, Carlos scored a decision win over veteran Humberto Tapia. Carlos suffered his first professional defeat from British boxer Amir Khan in December 2012.

Professional boxing record

|- style="margin:0.5em auto; font-size:95%;"
|align="center" colspan=8|17 Wins (7 knockouts), 2 Losses (1 knockout), 2 Draws
|- style="margin:0.5em auto; font-size:95%;"
|align=center style="border-style: none none solid solid; background: #e3e3e3"|Res.
|align=center style="border-style: none none solid solid; background: #e3e3e3"|Record
|align=center style="border-style: none none solid solid; background: #e3e3e3"|Opponent
|align=center style="border-style: none none solid solid; background: #e3e3e3"|Type
|align=center style="border-style: none none solid solid; background: #e3e3e3"|Rd., Time
|align=center style="border-style: none none solid solid; background: #e3e3e3"|Date
|align=center style="border-style: none none solid solid; background: #e3e3e3"|Location
|align=center style="border-style: none none solid solid; background: #e3e3e3"|Notes
|-align=center
| style="background: #B0C4DE"|Draw || 17-2-2 ||align=left| Mercito Gesta
|SD
|10
|April 30, 2015
|align=left| Fantasy Springs Casino, Indio, California
|align=left|
|- align=center
|Loss
|17-2-1
|align=left| Adrien Broner
|UD
|10
|May 3, 2014
|align=left| MGM Grand, Las Vegas, Nevada
|align=left|
|- align=center
|Loss
|17-1-1
|align=left| Amir Khan
|RTD
|10 (12), 3:00
|December 15, 2012
|align=left| Los Angeles Memorial Sports Arena, Los Angeles, California
|align=left|
|-align=center
|Win || 17-0-1 ||align=left| Marcos Leonardo Jimenez
|UD || 10 || June 16, 2012 ||align=left| Convention Center, McAllen, Texas
|align=left|
|-align=center
|Win || 16-0-1 ||align=left| Angino Perez
|UD || 10 || March 17, 2012 ||align=left| Convention Center, Pharr, Texas
|align=left|
|-align=center
|Win || 15-0-1 ||align=left| Manuel Leyva
|UD || 10 || December 3, 2011 ||align=left| Honda Center Anaheim, California, United States
|align=left|
|-align=center
| style="background: #B0C4DE"|Draw || 14-0-1 ||align=left| Juan Montiel
|SD|| 8 || August 13, 2011 ||align=left| The Joint, Las Vegas, Nevada
|align=left|
|-align=center
|Win || 14-0 ||align=left| John Figueroa
|UD || 8 || November 18, 2010 ||align=left| Club Nokia, Los Angeles, California
|align=left|
|-align=center
|Win || 13-0 ||align=left| Glenn Gonzales
|RTD || 5 (8), 3:00 || August 13, 2010 ||align=left| Sports Arena, Pico Rivera, California
|align=left|
|-align=center   
|Win || 12-0 ||align=left| Humberto Tapia
|UD || 8 || May 22, 2010 ||align=left| Staples Center, Los Angeles, California
|align=left|
|-align=center   
|Win || 11-0 ||align=left| Hensley Strachan
|UD || 4 || February 25, 2010
|align=left| Club Nokia, Los Angeles, California
|align=left|
|-align=center   
|Win || 10-0 ||align=left| Tyler Ziolkowski
|TKO || 1 (6), 0:54 || January 29, 2010 ||align=left| Hard Rock Hotel and Casino, Las Vegas, Nevada
|align=left|
|-align=center
|Win || 9-0 ||align=left| Antony Nelson
|KO || 1 (4), (2:13) || August 27, 2009 ||align=left| Club Nokia, Los Angeles, California
|align=left|
|-align=center
|Win || 8-0 ||align=left| Ever Luis Perez
|TKO || 4 (4), (2:39) || July 30, 2009 ||align=left| Club Nokia, Los Angeles, California
|align=left|
|-align=center
|Win || 7-0 ||align=left| Anthony Martinez
|UD || 6 || May 21, 2009 ||align=left| Hard Rock Hotel, San Diego, California
|align=left|
|-align=center
|Win || 6-0 ||align=left| Genier Pit
|KO || 4 (4), (2:17) || December 12, 2008 ||align=left| Alameda Swap Meet, Los Angeles, California
|align=left|
|-align=center
|Win || 5-0 ||align=left| Eligio Valenzuela
|TKO || 4 (4), (1:41) || October 17, 2008 ||align=left| Quiet Cannon, Montebello, California
|align=left|
|-align=center
|Win || 4-0 ||align=left| Ramon Flores
|TKO || 2 (4), (2:47) || July 30, 2008 ||align=left| Sycuan Resort & Casino, El Cajon, California
|align=left|
|-align=center
|Win || 3-0 ||align=left| Odilon Rivera
|UD || 4  || June 19, 2008 ||align=left| Marriott Hotel, Irvine, California
|align=left|
|-align=center
|Win || 2-0 ||align=left| Ricardo Martinez
|UD || 4  || August 18, 2007 ||align=left| Soboba Casino, San Jacinto, California
|align=left|
|-align=center
|Win || 1-0 ||align=left| Mario Juarez
|UD || 4 || May 25, 2007 ||align=left| Doubletree Hotel, Ontario, California
|align=left|
|-align=center

References

External links

 

Vacated

American boxers of Mexican descent
Boxers from California
Lightweight boxers
1985 births
Living people
American male boxers
People from Commerce, California